In astronomy, the intracluster medium (ICM) is the superheated plasma that permeates a galaxy cluster. The gas consists mainly of ionized hydrogen and helium and accounts for most of the baryonic material in galaxy clusters. The ICM is heated to temperatures on the order of 10 to 100 megakelvins, emitting strong X-ray radiation.

Composition
The ICM is composed primarily of ordinary baryons, mainly ionised hydrogen and helium. This plasma is enriched with heavier elements, including iron. The average amount of heavier elements relative to hydrogen, known as metallicity in astronomy, ranges from a third to a half of the value in the sun. Studying the chemical composition of the ICMs as a function of radius has  shown that cores of the galaxy clusters are more metal rich than at larger radii. In some clusters (e.g. the Centaurus cluster) the metallicity of the gas can rise to above that of the sun. Due to the gravitational field of clusters, metal-enriched gas ejected from supernova remains gravitationally bound to the cluster as part of the ICM. By looking at varying redshift, which corresponds to looking at different epochs of the evolution of the Universe, the ICM can provide a history record of element production in a galaxy.

Roughly 10% of a galaxy cluster's mass resides in the ICM. The stars and galaxies may contribute only 1% to the total mass. It is theorized that most of the mass in a galaxy cluster consists of dark matter and not baryonic matter. For the Virgo Cluster, the ICM contains roughly 3 × 1014 M☉ while the total mass of the cluster is estimated to be 1.2 × 1015 M☉.

Although the ICM on the whole contains the bulk of a cluster's baryons, it is not very dense, with typical values of 10−3 particles per cubic centimeter. The mean free path of the particles is roughly 1016 m, or about one lightyear. The density of the ICM rises towards the centre of the cluster with a relatively strong peak. In addition, the temperature of the ICM typically drops to 1/2 or 1/3 of the outer value in the central regions. Once the density of the plasma reaches a critical value, enough interactions between the ions ensures cooling via X-ray radiation.

Observing the intracluster medium
As the ICM is at such high temperatures, it emits X-ray radiation, mainly by the bremsstrahlung process and X-ray emission lines from the heavy elements. These X-rays can be observed using an X-ray telescope and through analysis of this data, it is possible to determine the physical conditions, including the temperature, density, and metallicity of the plasma.

Measurements of the temperature and density profiles in galaxy clusters allow for a determination of the mass distribution profile of the ICM through hydrostatic equilibrium modeling. The mass distributions determined from these methods reveal masses that far exceed the luminous mass seen and are thus a strong indication of dark matter in galaxy clusters.

Inverse Compton scattering of low energy photons through interactions with the relativistic electrons in the ICM cause distortions in the spectrum of the cosmic microwave background radiation (CMB), known as the Sunyaev–Zel'dovich effect. These temperature distortions in the CMB can be used by telescopes such as the South Pole Telescope to detect dense clusters of galaxies at high redshifts.

In December 2022, the James Webb Space Telescope is reported to be studying the faint light emitted in the intracluster medium. Which a 2018 study found to be an "accurate luminous tracer of dark matter".

Cooling flows 
Plasma in regions of the cluster, with a cooling time shorter than the age of the system, should be cooling due to strong X-ray radiation where emission is proportional to the density squared. Since the density of the ICM is highest towards the center of the cluster, the radiative cooling time drops a significant amount. The central cooled gas can no longer support the weight of the external hot gas and the pressure gradient drives what is known as a cooling flow where the hot gas from the external regions flows slowly towards the center of the cluster. This inflow would result in regions of cold gas and thus regions of new star formation. Recently however, with the launch of new X-ray telescopes such as the Chandra X-ray Observatory, images of galaxy clusters with better spatial resolution have been taken. These new images do not indicate signs of new star formation on the order of what was historically predicted, motivating research into the mechanisms that would prevent the central ICM from cooling.

Heating

There are two popular explanations of the mechanisms that prevent the central ICM from cooling: feedback from active galactic nuclei through injection of relativistic jets of plasma and sloshing of the ICM plasma during mergers with subclusters. The relativistic jets of material from active galactic nuclei can be seen in images taken by telescopes with high angular resolution such as the Chandra X-ray Observatory.

See also
 Interstellar medium
 List of plasma (physics) articles

References

Large-scale structure of the cosmos
Extragalactic astronomy
Medium, intracluster
Space plasmas
Plasma physics
Intergalactic media